Compact Jazz: The Swingle Singers is a compilation album of previously released tracks from 3 Philips Swingle Singers recordings: Place Vendôme (a.k.a. Encounter)  (7 tracks / complete), Getting Romantic (a.k.a. Les Romantiques) (6 tracks) and Spanish Masters (a.k.a. Sounds of Spain) (3 tracks).

Track listing 
 "Air for G String" (Bach)  – 5:37
 "Zortzico" (Albéniz)  – 2:05
 "Scherzo" ("Sonata op. 24 for violin and piano") (Beethoven)  – 1:11
 "Three Windows" (John Lewis)  – 7:09
 "Aranjuez" (after the "Adagio", 2nd movement of the Concierto de Aranjuez) (Vidre)  – 4:18
 "When I am Laid in Earth" ("Dido's Lament") (Purcell)  – 5:03
 "Tango in D Major" (No. 2 from "España" op. 165)  – 2:12
 "Etude Op. 25 No. 2" (Chopin)  – 1:27
 "Vendome" (Lewis)  – 3:31
 "Le Marche de Limoges" ("Pictures at an Exhibition") (Mussorgsky)  – 1:23
 "Little David's Fugue" ("Sascha") (Lewis)  – 4:15
 "Andante" (Quartet op. 44 no. 1) (Mendelssohn)  – 3:28
 "Ricercare à 6" (from "The Musical Offering") (Bach)  – 6:29
 "Romance Espagnole" ("Jeux Interdits" / "Spanish Romance") (anonymous)  – 2:34
 "Alexander's Fugue" (Lewis)  – 4:50
 "Little Prelude and Fugue" ("Album for the Young") (Schumann)  – 2:09

Personnel 
The Swingle Singers:
 Christiane Legrand – soprano
 Jeanette Baucomont – soprano
 Claudine Meunier – alto
 Alice Herald – alto
 Ward Swingle – tenor, arranger
 Claude Germain – tenor
 Jean Cussac – bass
 José Germain – bass
Rhythm section:
 Daniel Humair – drums
 Guy Pedersen – double bass
The Modern Jazz Quartet:
 John Lewis – piano
 Milt Jackson – vibraphone
 Percy Heath – double bass
 Connie Kay – drums

References / external links 

 Mercury 830-701-2
 Compact Jazz: The Swingle Singers at [ Allmusic.com]

The Swingle Singers albums
1987 compilation albums
Mercury Records compilation albums